The Mount Isarog shrew-mouse (Archboldomys luzonensis) is a species of rodent in the family Muridae found only in the Philippines. Its natural habitats include subtropical or tropical dry forest.  It is threatened by habitat loss due to logging operations.

References

Rats of Asia
Endemic fauna of the Philippines
Fauna of Luzon
Rodents of the Philippines
Mammals described in 1982
Vulnerable fauna of Asia
Archboldomys
Taxonomy articles created by Polbot